Kamraniyeh-ye Pain (also Romanized as Kāmrānīyeh-ye Pā’īn; also known as Kāmrānī and Kāmrānīyeh) is a village in Azizabad Rural District, in the Central District of Narmashir County, Kerman Province, Iran. At the 2006 census, its population was 248, in 69 families.

References 

Populated places in Narmashir County